XHGMS-FM is a radio station on 104.5 FM in Martínez de la Torre, Veracruz. The station is owned by Grupo MS Multimedios, the business of the Manterola Sainz family, and carries a pop format known as 104.5 FM Sólo Hits.

History
XEHU-FM received its concession on June 29, 1972. It was highly unusual as the only FM radio station in southern Mexico to carry an XE callsign. The callsign came from co-owned XEHU-AM 1300, which migrated to FM as XHHU-FM 89.9.

On January 29, 2019, the station officially became XHGMS-FM, though the station had unofficially used those call letters since at least 2012.

References

Radio stations in Veracruz